Julian Gbur (November 14, 1942 – March 24, 2011) was the bishop of the Ukrainian Catholic Eparchy of Stryi, Ukraine.

Born in Brzeżawa, Poland, Gbur was ordained to the priesthood in 1970. He was named auxiliary bishop in 1994 and in 2000 was appointed bishop of the Stryi Eparchy.

References

Polish bishops
Bishops of the Ukrainian Greek Catholic Church
People from Przemyśl County
1942 births
2011 deaths